Majewo may refer to the following places:
Majewo, Podlaskie Voivodeship (north-east Poland)
Majewo, Tczew County in Pomeranian Voivodeship (north Poland)
Majewo, Warmian-Masurian Voivodeship (north Poland)